This is a list of breakfast cereal advertising characters.

Cereal Partners Worldwide
 Klondike Pete

Force Food Company
 Sunny Jim

General Mills 
 Boo Berry
 Buzz the Bee
 Cookie Jarvis
 Cookie Crook and Officer Crumb
 Chip the Dog
 Chip the Wolf
 Count Alfred Chocula
 Chef Wendell (defunct)
 Crazy Squares
 Franken Berry
 Fruit Brute
 Fillmore Bear
 Hoppity Hooper
 Lucky the Leprechaun
 Major Jet
 Maxwell Masher
 Pac-Man
 Professor Waldo Wigglesworth
 Rocky and Bullwinkle
 Sonny the Cuckoo Bird
 Strawberry Shortcake
 Trix Rabbit
 Yummy Mummy

Kellogg Company 
 Big Yella
 Bigg Mixx
 Captain Rik
 Cinnamon and Apple
 Coco the Monkey 
 Chocos the Bear (defunct)
 Cornelius Rooster
 Crunchosaurus Rex
 Dig 'Em the Frog
 Donald Duck
 Loopy Bee
 Milton the Toaster
 OJ Joe
PoKéMoN
 Quick Draw McGraw
 Snap, Crackle and Pop
 Sammy the Seal
 Sunny the Sun
 Tinker Bell
 Tony the Tiger
 Toucan Sam
 Woody Woodpecker
 Who, the Wizard of Oatz
 Yogi Bear
 Zimmys Cinnamon Stars

Nestlé
 Lion
 Pico
 Quiky the Nesquik Bunny
 Snow
 Captain Star

Post Cereals 
 Crispy
 Fred Flintstone and Barney Rubble
 The Honeycomb Kid
 Hunger
 Linus the Lionhearted
 Loveable Truly
 Sugar Bear

Quaker Oats Company
 Cap'n Crunch
 Honey Monster
 Jean LaFoote
 King Vitaman
 Little Mikey
 Quisp

Ralston Purina Company
 The Freakies

Weetabix Food Company
 Professor Weeto

See also
 List of breakfast cereals

References

Breakfast cereal